Arthur's Dyke is a 2001 British film directed by Gerry Poulson and starring Pauline Quirke and Brian Conley.  The plot follows a group of ramblers as they attempt to recreate their conquest of the Offa's Dyke path 20 years earlier.

Premise
The film begins with a flashback to 20 years earlier, with four friends celebrating after completing the Offa's Dyke walk, from Chepstow to Prestatyn.

External links

British comedy films
2000s English-language films
2000s British films